Yery with diaeresis (Ӹ ӹ; italics: Ӹ ӹ) is a letter of the Cyrillic script. Its form is derived from the Cyrillic letter Yery (Ы ы Ы ы). In Unicode, this letter is known as "Yeru with Diaeresis".

Yery with diaeresis is used in the alphabet of the Hill Mari language, where it represents the mid central vowel . It also appears in the Northwestern Mari language.

Computing codes

See also
Cyrillic characters in Unicode
Ÿ ÿ : Latin letter Ÿ

References

Cyrillic letters with diacritics
Letters with diaeresis